Hacienda La Avellana Mixed Wildlife Refuge, is a protected area in Costa Rica, managed under the Central Pacific Conservation Area, it was created in 1988 by decree 18186-MIRENEM.

References 

Nature reserves in Costa Rica
Protected areas established in 1988